1230 Aluminium Alloy has aluminium as the major element, and has silicon, zinc, copper, titanium, vanadium, manganese and magnesium as minor elements.

Chemical Composition

Aluminum alloy table 

 Aluminium alloys

References